Kalmiyary is a rural locality (a village) in Bikbardinskoye Rural Settlement, Kuyedinsky District, Perm Krai, Russia. The population was 112 as of 2010. There are 3 streets.

Geography 
Kalmiyary is located 18 km east of Kuyeda (the district's administrative centre) by road. Novonatalyino is the nearest rural locality.

References 

Rural localities in Kuyedinsky District